Due to the perceived negative connotations of video games, both industry members and consumers of video games have frequently collaborated to counter this perception by engaging in video gaming for charitable purposes. Some of these have been charitable groups, or regular and annual events, and the scope of these efforts have continued to grow, with more than  having been raised by video game-related charity efforts in the first half of 2018 alone.

Organizations and events

Child's Play 

The creators of the Penny Arcade webcomic, Jerry Holkins and Mike Krahulik, established the Child's Play charity in 2003 following a string of mass media stories that attempted to portray video games in a negative light. The charity was designed to provide toys and video game systems and games to various children's hospitals in the United States, though both monetary and physical donations. By 2017, Child's Play had raised over  through both cash donations and donated items.

Extra Life 

Extra Life is an annual charity fund-raising event to support the Children's Miracle Network Hospitals. The event was started in 2008 to honor Victoria , a teenager who died of acute lymphoblastic leukemia. While gamers accept funds for Extra Life throughout the year, the event encourages streamers to play video games for twenty-four hours straight via Twitch or other streaming services over a specific weekend in November, and collect additional donations from their viewers.

Desert Bus For Hope 

The comedy group LoadingReadyRun ran a Child's Play event in 2007 by marathon-playing the game Desert Bus, a game created by Penn & Teller, in which the player must drive a bus on a desolate stretch of highway from Tucson to Las Vegas, roughly eight hours of continuous gameplay, with little challenge outside of player fatigue. The event was successful, in part due to recognition from Penn & Teller, and eventually spun out into its own annual "Desert Bus for Hope" event. During the stream, broadcast over Twitch and other streaming sites, viewers can donate to get virtual time behind the bus's wheel, as well as participate in various auctions.

Games Done Quick 

Games Done Quick was launched in 2010, inspired by the Desert Bus for Hope, with the idea that invited participants speedrun numerous games over the course of the event, typically five to six days, usually with commentary over the course of the games. During semi-annual event, the speedruns are performed live in front of an audience and broadcast to Twitch and other services, with viewers able to donate during the length of the event. There has also been shorter one-off special Games Done Quick events for specific occasions, such as one to support the victims of the 2011 Tōhoku earthquake and tsunami.

Humble Bundle 

Humble Bundle was initially launched by Wolfire Games in 2010 as a series of game bundles, most frequently indie games, offered at a pay-what-you-want price, with all but a few dollars of each sale going to a designated charity. As the bundles became more successful, Humble Bundle's approach expanded to include other bundles, such as mobile games, console games, and digital books, as well as establishing its own company, created publishing support for indie games and establishing a dedicated storefront, where a portion of each purchase goes to a selected charity.

Notable one-off efforts

Pink Overwatch Mercy skin 
During May 2018, to support the Breast Cancer Research Foundation, Blizzard Entertainment offered a limited time character customization skin for the Overwatch character Mercy that reflected the pink colors of breast cancer awareness, with all revenue from the sale of the skin going to the Foundation.

2018 E3 Fortnite Pro-Am 
Epic Games ran a celebrity Fortnite Battle Royale pro-am during the Electronic Entertainment Expo 2018 in June 2018, which paired 50 popular streams with 50 celebrities, with an overall  prize pool to be given to the winners in the names of their desired charities.

H.Bomberguy's stream for Mermaids 
In January 2019, streamer Harry Brewis aka "hbomberguy" ran a marathon stream to beat Donkey Kong 64 and raise money for Mermaids, a British charity for transgender youth. The stream began following comments made by Graham Linehan which Brewis considered transphobic, and whilst potential funding of Mermaids by the British National Lottery was under review. Word of mouth about the stream quickly spread and several notable pro-trans supporters briefly joined his stream, including John Romero, Chelsea Manning, and U.S. congresswoman Alexandria Ocasio-Cortez.

References 

Charity fundraising
History of video games
Online charity
Video game culture